Chant Down Babylon is a remix album by various hip hop and rock artists covering songs by Bob Marley & The Wailers, released in 1999, produced by Stephen Marley.

The remixed version of "Turn Your Lights Down Low" with Lauryn Hill was released as a single. The music video for the song directed by Francis Lawrence features Hill and her partner Rohan Marley, one of Bob's sons.

Track listing

Charts

Weekly charts

Year-end charts

Certifications and sales

References

Bob Marley and the Wailers compilation albums
1999 remix albums
1999 compilation albums
Island Records remix albums
Island Records compilation albums
Tuff Gong albums